Thierry Dushimirimana is a Rwandan photographer and filmmaker.

Filmography
 In A Love Letter to My Country (2006), a Tutsi survivor falls in love with a Hutu man from a family involved in the  Rwanda Genocide against the Tutsi. The film screened at several international film festivals, including the Tribeca Film Festival in New York City in 2011.He has collaborated with Eric Kabera, working with him as cinematographer on Juan Reina's 2010 documentary Iseta – behind the roadblock, which followed a British journalist Nick Hughes returning to find out more about the murder he had photographed in Kigali (Gikondo) in 1994.
 Une Lettre d'amour à mon pays [A Love Letter to My Country], 2006. 36 min. Director.
 Iseta: Behind the Roadblock, 2010, dir. Juan Reina. Cinematographer.
 6954 Kilometres to Home / 6954 kilometriä kotiin, 2013, dir. Juan Reina. Production Manager.

References

External links
 

Year of birth missing (living people)
Living people
Rwandan film directors
Rwandan film producers
Rwandan cinematographers